Saint Vincent and the Grenadines competed at the 2016 Summer Olympics in Rio de Janeiro, Brazil, from 5 to 21 August 2016. This was the nation's eighth consecutive appearance at the Summer Olympics.

The St. Vincent and the Grenadines National Olympic Committee sent the nation's largest delegation to the Games since 2000. Four athletes, two per gender, were selected to the roster, competing only in both swimming and track and field. All of them made their Olympic debut in Rio de Janeiro, except for sprinter Kineke Alexander, who spearheaded the delegation at her third straight Games as the oldest and most experienced competitor (aged 30) and the nation's flag bearer in the opening ceremony.

Athletics (track and field)
 
Athletes from Saint Vincent and the Grenadines have so far achieved qualifying standards in the following athletics events (up to a maximum of 3 athletes in each event):

Track & road events

Swimming

Saint Vincent and the Grenadines have received a Universality invitation from FINA to send two swimmers (one male and one female) to the Olympics.

See also
Saint Vincent and the Grenadines at the 2015 Pan American Games

References

External links 
 

Nations at the 2016 Summer Olympics
2016
2016 in Saint Vincent and the Grenadines